Live Mud is the first live album released by Mudhoney. It was recorded live in Mexico City in 2005 by Brett Eliason. Only 500 vinyl copies were made.

Track listing
 "Mudride"
 "The Straight Life"
 "I Saw the Light"
 "No One Has"
 "Our Time Is Now"
 "Touch Me I'm Sick"
 "On the Move"
 "Suck You Dry"
 "Hard-on for War"
 "In & Out of Grace"
 "Hate the Police"

Mudhoney albums
2007 live albums
Live grunge albums
Sub Pop live albums